Totsky (masculine), Totskaya (feminine), or Totskoye (neuter) may refer to:

People 
Konstantin Totsky, Russian diplomat and current ambassador to NATO

Places 
Totsky District, a district in Orenburg Oblast, Russia
Totskoye, a village in Orenburg Oblast, Russia
Totskoye Vtoroye, a village in Orenburg Oblast, Russia
Totskoye range, a military range, a Soviet nuclear test site
Lake Totskoye, a lake in Vologda Oblast, Russia
Totskoye (air base)